The Baldface-Royce Range is a range of mountains in western Maine and eastern New Hampshire, in the United States. They are located in the town of Chatham, New Hampshire, and the townships of Bean's Purchase, New Hampshire, and Batchelders Grant, Maine, in the eastern part of the White Mountains.

Mountains in the Baldface-Royce range
From south to north:
Eastman Mountain, ascended by the Eastman Mountain Trail from the Slippery Brook Trail
South Baldface, ascended by the Baldface Circle Trail
North Baldface, ascended by the Baldface Circle Trail and Bicknell Ridge Trail
Mount Meader, ascended by the Mount Meader Trail, Basin Rim Trail and Meader Ridge Trail
West Royce Mountain, has limited views from its wooded summit; ascended by the Royce Trail, Burnt Mill Brook Trail, and Basin Rim Trail
East Royce Mountain, has good views from its open summit; ascended by the Royce Trail, East Royce Trail, Laughing Lion Trail, and Burnt Mill Brook Trail

See also
Speckled Mountain, located east of the Baldface-Royce Range in Maine
Wild River (Androscoggin River), forming the valley to the northwest of the range

Mountain ranges of New Hampshire
Mountain ranges of Maine
Landforms of Carroll County, New Hampshire
Landforms of Coös County, New Hampshire
Landforms of Oxford County, Maine